Pyritinol also called pyridoxine disulfide or pyrithioxine (European drug names Encephabol, Encefabol, Cerbon 6) is a semi-synthetic water-soluble analog of vitamin B6 (Pyridoxine HCl). It was produced in 1961 by Merck Laboratories by bonding 2 vitamin B6 compounds (pyridoxine) together with a disulfide bridge. Since the 1970s, it has been a prescription and OTC drug in several countries for cognitive disorders, rheumatoid arthritis, and learning disorders in children. Since the early 1990s it has been sold as a nootropic dietary supplement in the United States.

Availability 
It is approved for "symptomatic treatment of chronically impaired brain function in dementia syndromes" and for "supportive treatment of sequelae of craniocerebral trauma" in various European countries, including Austria, Germany, France, Italy, Portugal, and Greece. In France it is also approved for rheumatoid arthritis as a disease modifying drug, on the basis of the results of clinical trials. In many countries it is available over the counter and is widely advertised on the internet as being for "memory disturbances."

Effects 
review refs needed

Adverse effects 
Adverse effects include nausea, headache, and rarely allergic reaction (mild skin reactions).  A 2004 survey of six case reports suggested a link between pyritinol and severe cholestatic hepatitis when on several drugs for certain diseases.

Other rare side effects: acute pancreatitis and photoallergic eruption.

See also 
 Emoxypine
 Pirisudanol
 Sulbutiamine

References

External links

Antioxidants
Nootropics
Organic disulfides
Pyridines
Phenols
Primary alcohols